In Greek mythology, Eurydice (Ancient Greek: Εὐρυδίκη , Eurydikē  "wide justice", derived from ευρυς eurys "wide" and δικη dike "justice), may refer to the following characters:

 Eurydice, one of the 50 Nereids, sea-nymph daughters of the 'Old Man of the Sea' Nereus and the Oceanid Doris.
 Eurydice, wife of King Aeolus of Aeolia and mother of his sons, Sisyphus, Salmoneus and Cretheus. She may be identical to Enarete, the daughter of Deïmachus, who was commonly called the mother of these progeny.
 Eurydice, a Libyan princess as one of the 50 Danaïdes, daughter of King Danaus and the naiad Polyxo, who married (and murdered) Dryas.
 Eurydice, one of the Cadmiades, the six daughters of Cadmus and Harmonia in a rare version of the myth. Her sisters were Ino, Agaue, Semele, Kleantho and Eurynome.
 Eurydice, a Spartan princess as the daughter of King Lacedaemon. She was the mother of Danae by her husband King Acrisius of Argos.
 Eurydice, daughter of Adrastus, wife of Ilus, and mother of King Laomedon.
 Eurydice, wife of Neleus, mother of Thrasymedes.
 Eurydice, an Elean princess as the daughter of King Pelops of Pisa. She was the wife of Electryon, and grandmother of Heracles.
 Eurydice, wife of Orpheus who attempted to bring her back from the Underworld.
 Eurydice, wife of King Creon of Thebes and mother of Haemon, Menoeceus and Megara.
 Eurydice, a Minyan princess as daughter of King Clymenus of Orchomenus. She was the wife of King Nestor of Pylos.
 Eurydice, an Argive princess as the daughter of King Amphiaraus and Eriphyle, and thus, sister to Alcmaeon, Amphilochus, Demonassa, Alcmena and Alexida.
 Eurydice, wife of King Lycurgus (of Nemea) and mother of Opheltes.
Eurydice, wife of Aeneas, according to Lescheos and writer of the epic poem Cypria.

Notes

References 

 Apollodorus, The Library with an English Translation by Sir James George Frazer, F.B.A., F.R.S. in 2 Volumes, Cambridge, MA, Harvard University Press; London, William Heinemann Ltd. 1921. ISBN 0-674-99135-4. Online version at the Perseus Digital Library. Greek text available from the same website.
Diodorus Siculus, The Library of History translated by Charles Henry Oldfather. Twelve volumes. Loeb Classical Library. Cambridge, Massachusetts: Harvard University Press; London: William Heinemann, Ltd. 1989. Vol. 3. Books 4.59–8. Online version at Bill Thayer's Web Site
 Diodorus Siculus, Bibliotheca Historica. Vol 1-2. Immanel Bekker. Ludwig Dindorf. Friedrich Vogel. in aedibus B. G. Teubneri. Leipzig. 1888–1890. Greek text available at the Perseus Digital Library.
 Grimal, Pierre, The Dictionary of Classical Mythology, Wiley-Blackwell, 1996. .
 Hyginus, Gaius Julius, Fabulae from The Myths of Hyginus translated and edited by Mary Grant. University of Kansas Publications in Humanistic Studies. Online version at the Topos Text Project.
 Homer, The Odyssey with an English Translation by A.T. Murray, Ph.D. in two volumes. Cambridge, MA., Harvard University Press; London, William Heinemann, Ltd. 1919. Online version at the Perseus Digital Library. Greek text available from the same website.
Lucius Mestrius Plutarchus, Moralia with an English Translation by Frank Cole Babbitt. Cambridge, MA. Harvard University Press. London. William Heinemann Ltd. 1936. Online version at the Perseus Digital Library. Greek text available from the same website.
 Pausanias, Description of Greece with an English Translation by W.H.S. Jones, Litt.D., and H.A. Ormerod, M.A., in 4 Volumes. Cambridge, MA, Harvard University Press; London, William Heinemann Ltd. 1918. . Online version at the Perseus Digital Library
Pausanias, Graeciae Descriptio. 3 vols. Leipzig, Teubner. 1903.  Greek text available at the Perseus Digital Library.
 Publius Papinius Statius, The Thebaid translated by John Henry Mozley. Loeb Classical Library Volumes. Cambridge, MA, Harvard University Press; London, William Heinemann Ltd. 1928. Online version at the Topos Text Project.
 Publius Papinius Statius, The Thebaid. Vol I-II. John Henry Mozley. London: William Heinemann; New York: G.P. Putnam's Sons. 1928. Latin text available at the Perseus Digital Library.
 Sophocles, The Antigone of Sophocles edited with introduction and notes by Sir Richard Jebb. Cambridge. Cambridge University Press. 1893. Online version at the Perseus Digital Library.
 Sophocles, Sophocles. Vol 1: Oedipus the king. Oedipus at Colonus. Antigone. With an English translation by F. Storr. The Loeb classical library, 20. Francis Storr. London; New York. William Heinemann Ltd.; The Macmillan Company. 1912. Greek text available at the Perseus Digital Library.

Nereids
Danaids
Princesses in Greek mythology
Queens in Greek mythology
Argive characters in Greek mythology
Libyan characters in Greek mythology